Pablo Piñones Arce (born 27 August 1981) is a Swedish former footballer. He played as a forward throughout his career and won 7 caps for the Swedish national under-21 team. He is the manager of Hammarby IF's women's team, competing in the Swedish top tier Damallsvenskan.

Playing career
After having spent his early career in minor clubs, such as IFK Tumba and IK Sirius, he became a part of the highly successful IF Brommapojkarna squad of 1981-born youngsters. In 1999, he moved to Venezia in Italy, being however featured only with the youth squad, and marking no appearances in the first team. In 2001, he was transferred to Hammarby IF.

The club won the league the same year, Piñones Arce however did not feature in any competitive games. He went on to establish himself as a regular for Hammarby during the following five seasons. In all, he managed to score 20 goals in 95 appearances for the Stockholm-based side.

After the 2006 season, he was not offered a new contract with Hammarby. But his final third of the season showed that he had a lot more to give as he was able to score six goals in only thirteen matches. The club then changed their mind and offered him a contract extension. But instead Pablo chose to sign a 3-year contract with the Danish club Vejle Boldklub running from 1 January 2007.

He enjoyed a successful spell abroad, scoring 25 goals in 52 appearances for Vejle. However, his stint at the club was cut short after a reported conflict with teammate Brian Priske. He then returned to his former youth club IF Brommapojkarna on loan in March 2009, and later signed for the club on a permanent deal.

Piñones Arce kept up a good scoring-form at Brommapojkarna, scoring a total of 34 goals in 68 appearances in both Allsvenskan and Superettan for the club. He was also named the top scorer of Superettan in 2012. In January 2013 he left Brommapojkarna after he and the club could not agree on the financial terms for a new contract.

After spending a year with Östers IF in Allsvenskan, he returned to Hammarby in Superettan for the 2014 season on a two year-deal.

He scored 10 goals during the 2014 season when Hammarby gained a promotion to Allsvenskan. After the 2015 season he left the club when his contract expired, being used more sparingly in the starting lineup during the latter year. Instead, he chose to join Brommapojkarna for a third stint in the Swedish Division 1 on 1 January 2016.

However, Piñones Arce was forced into retirement a few months later due to injuries, at age 35.

Managerial career
In late April 2016, he returned to Hammarby as a first team coach, acting as a link between the squad and the rest of the coaching staff as his primary responsibility. Later the same year, he was promoted to assistant manager when Carlos Banda resigned from this position.

Before the start of the 2017 season, it was announced that he would continue as an assistant manager at the club, though Hammarby switched their manager from Nanne Bergstrand to Jakob Michelsen.

Career statistics

Honours

Club
Hammarby  FF
Allsvenskan: 2001
Superettan: 2014

Individual
Superettan Top Scorer: 2012

References

External links
 
 

1981 births
Living people
People from Tumba, Sweden
Swedish people of Chilean descent
Sportspeople of Chilean descent
Swedish people of Spanish descent
Sportspeople of Spanish descent
Swedish footballers
Sweden under-21 international footballers
Danish Superliga players
Danish 1st Division players
Allsvenskan players
Superettan players
Ettan Fotboll players
Division 2 (Swedish football) players
Hammarby Fotboll players
Venezia F.C. players
Vejle Boldklub players
IF Brommapojkarna players
Östers IF players
Expatriate footballers in Italy
Expatriate men's footballers in Denmark
Hammarby Fotboll non-playing staff
Association football forwards
Sportspeople from Stockholm County